William Creagh (died 19 July 1469) was a Roman Catholic prelate who served as Bishop of Limerick (1458-1469).

Biography
Begley states that very little is known about Creagh's episcopacy other than the records of appointments made in that period and that Creagh recovered the lands at Donaghmore.

See also
Catholic Church in Ireland

References

1469 deaths
Irish Roman Catholic bishops